Sideways is an extended play (EP) by American singer and songwriter Wrabel, released on 24 June 2014 by Island Records.

Ten Feet Tall 
The song "Ten Feet Tall" was first released on 4 February 2014 as a single from Afrojack's album Forget the World. The version of "Ten Feet Tall" on the Sideways EP is the original piano-based version, done without Afrojack.

Track listing

Charts

Release history

References

2014 EPs
Wrabel EPs
Universal Music Australia EPs